Hotel Savonia is a Best Western hotel located in Kuopio, Finland. It is also an educational unit, housing the Tourism, Catering and Domestic Services branch of the Savonia University of Applied Sciences.

External links
Official website

Savonia
Buildings and structures in Kuopio